Sundergarh Ra Salman Khan is a 2018 Indian Odia-language comedy film, starring Babushaan. The Film is also the debut film of Divya, as the female lead. The film released on 13 June 2018 on Raja Festival of Odisha that falls in mid June 2018. This film is remake of 1999 Malayalam film Udayapuram Sulthan.

Cast 

 Babushaan Mohanty as Salman Khan 
 Mihir Das as Abhinash Rayachaudhury
 Divyadisha Mohanty as Ganga 
 Bobby Mishra as Naik Mardaraj 
 Papu Pom Pom /Tatwaprakash Satpathy as Tingeshwar Acharya (Tinga Nawnaa)
 K.K as Pralaya Mardaraj 
 Ushashi Mishra as Saraswati 
 Aiswarya Behera as Lalita 
 Salil Mitra as Lingaraj Parida (Linga Manager )
 Udit Guru as Giridhari 
 Tribhuban Panda as Joseph
 Subhranshu Nayak as Sukumar Rayachaudhury
 Soumya Ranjan Kanungo as Nirakar Rayachaudhury
 Puspa Panda as Annapurna Rayachaudhury 
 Suman Maharana as Markhande
 Kunmun Jena as Sudha Rayachaudhury
 Kanhu Charan Mohanty (Tullu) as Thatala Purohit
 Debu Brahma as Foreign Nawnaa
 Rabi Kumar as Temple Purohit
 Lina as Wife of Foreign Nawnaa
 Niranjan Acharya as Temple Purohit 
Rabi Mishra 
 Satyaki Mishra as Salman's Father/Mr. Jabbar Khan

Soundtrack
The music is composed by Abhijit Mazumdar for the film.

References

External links

2018 films
2010s Odia-language films
2018 masala films
Indian comedy films
Odia remakes of Malayalam films
Films directed by Ashok Pati
2018 comedy films